Kanyakubja Brahmins are an endogamous Brahmin community mainly found in northern India. They are classified as one of the Pancha Gauda Brahmin communities native to the north of the Vindhyas.

Social status
In states like Uttar Pradesh and Bihar, they are considered the highest class of Brahmins.

Notable people
 Atal Bihari Vajpayee, former Prime Minister of India

References

Brahmin communities of Uttar Pradesh
Brahmin communities of Bihar
Brahmin communities of Madhya Pradesh
Brahmin communities of West Bengal
Brahmin communities of Assam
Indian castes